Alexandra (Aleka) Stratigou (1926 – January 1, 1989) was a Greek actress.  She appeared in theatre and  had 61 film and television credits and had a  characterful, distinctive voice.  She was the wife of Andreas Barkoulis.  She died on January 1, 1989, and is buried in Peristeri.  She was the sister of Stefanos, Stella and Rena.

Filmography
 1951	Ekeines poy den prepei n' agapoun
 1956	Tsiganiko aima
 1957	Tsarouhi, pistoli, papiyion
 1958	To trelokoritso
 1958  Diakopes stin Aigina
 1958  Makria ap' ton kosmo
 1958  O Mimikos kai h Mairi
 1958  To koritsi tis amartias
 1959	Krystallw
 1959	I moysitsa
 1959	Oi dosatzides
 1959	To agorokoritso
 1959	Erotika skandala
 1959	Douleis me fountes
 1959	Enas vlakas kai misos
 1959	O theios apo ton Kanada
 1959	O Thymios ta 'kane thalassa
 1959	Diakopes stin Kolopetinitsa
 1960	Tsakitzis
 1960  Agapoula mou
 1960  Meta tin amartia
 1960  Erotika paihnidia
 1960  I kyria dimarxos
 1960  O Thymios ta 'xei 400
 1960  To nisi tis agapis
 1960  Makrykostaioi kai Kontogiwrgides
 1961  Horis mitera
 1961  Flogera kai aima
 1962  O gero-Dimos
 1962  Prepei na ziseis timia
 1962  O gampros mou, o dikigoros
 1963  Ta paidia tis Mantalenas
 1963  Oi aneidikeytoi / Eytyxws hwris douleia
 1964  Oi proikothires
 1964  Nyxtoperpatimata
 1964  Enas zorikos dekaneas
 1964  I gefyra tis Eytyxias
 1964  O Giannis ta 'kane thalassa
 1965	Rimagmeno spiti
 1965	Bethoven kai mpoyzoyki
 1965	Ftwos ekatommyriouxos
 1965	To romantzo mias kamarieras
 1967	Oydeis anamartitos
 1967	I koinwnia mas adikise
 1967	Praktwr Kitsos kalei Gastouni
 1968  I thyrwrina
 1968  Gorgopotamos
 1969	I Smyrnia
 1969	Gampros apo ti Gastoyni
 1970	I sklava
 1970	I peripterou
 1970	Enas Kitsos sta mpoyzoykia
 1971	Katw oi antres
 1971	Mara i tsigana
 1971	Ta omorfopaida
 1971	Mia ntanta kai teza oloi
 1972	O anthropos roloi
 1982	O Thanasis kai to katarameno fidi

External links

1926 births
1989 deaths
Greek actresses
Actresses from Athens
20th-century Greek actresses